Qfwfq is the narrator of many stories appearing in several works by Italian author Italo Calvino.

Description
Qfwfq is as old as the universe and has taken various forms, of which Qfwfq retains its memory in later incarnations. For example, in the short story "Blood, Sea" (found in the collection t zero) this character is a man riding in a car with three other people, but this man also remembers when he lived in the form of an amoeba of sorts inhabiting a primeval ocean.  He also describes Zylphia, one of the other car passengers, as having been there, raising the question of whether Qfwfq is able to take multiple discrete physical forms at once. Qfwfq also describes having a family, who seem also to transcend time in a similar manner (for example, they had an uncle who was a fish while the rest of the family has evolved into amphibians).  He also has a competitive relationship with a similar entity named Kgwgk, which results in the invention of art. In some stories he mentions other entities who are his friends or acquaintances and also has been going around for centuries in the Universe.

He is described as "not surprised by anything", and characteristically "not at all sentimental about being the last dinosaur".

Books in which character appears
 Cosmicomics --- Qfwfq narrates all but two of the short stories in this collection.
 t zero --- Qfwfq narrates most of the stories in this collection. The first four stories are in a section titled, "More of Qfwfq".
 Numbers in the Dark and other stories --- Qfwfq narrates the final two stories in this collection, "Implosion" and "Nothing and Not Much".

Qfwfq's name
The name "Qfwfq" (as well as "Kgwgk") is a palindrome. The name may be an allusion to the first law of thermodynamics; substituting = for f gives Q=W=Q, which describes a heat engine.

Notes and references

Italo Calvino
Male characters in literature
Fictional storytellers